Pompholyxophrys is a genus of Opisthokonta.

It includes the species Pompholyxophrys punicea.

References

Holomycota